Sándor Bródy may refer to

Sándor Bródy (writer) (1863–1924), Hungarian writer
Sándor Bródy (footballer) (1884–1944), Hungarian footballer
Alexander Brody (businessman) (Sándor Bródy, born 1933), Hungarian-American businessman and writer